Country Hills is a residential neighbourhood in the northwest quadrant of Calgary, Alberta. It is bounded to the north by the Country Hills Boulevard, to the south by Beddington Trail, and to the east by Harvest Hills Boulevard. To the southwest, it is bordered by the Country Hills golf course which began construction in 1989 and opened in 1992. The clubhouse along with the fully developed course opened in 1999. the area is also bordered by the West Nose Creek. The new community of Country Hills Village is located in the northeast of the neighbourhood. Country Hills is a generally calm and quiet area.

Country Hills was established in 1990. It is represented in the Calgary City Council by the Ward 3 councillor.

Demographics

Residents in this community had a median household income of $70,237 in 2000, and there were 7.4% low income residents living in the neighbourhood. As of 2000, 18.7% of the residents were immigrants. A proportion of 9.5% of the buildings were condominiums or apartments, and 6.8% of the housing was used for renting.
Country Hills Library serves this community. It is located at 11950 Country Village Link N.E. in VIVO. (Formerly Cardel Place.)

The future Green Line LRT will serve the area with a station set to be built at 96th Avenue N that has plans dating back to between the mid-1990s to the mid-2000s. Another station is planned at the current Northpointe bus terminal. An airport LRT link is also planned to built that would connect the 96th Avenue station with Calgary International Airport and the future 88th Avenue station on the Blue Line LRT in Savanna.

See also
List of neighbourhoods in Calgary

References

External links
Northern Hills (Cinnamon Hills, Country Hills, Coventry Hills, Harvest Hills, Panorama Hills) Community Association

Neighbourhoods in Calgary